In applied psychology, interventions are actions performed to bring about change in people. A wide range of intervention strategies exist and they are directed towards various types of issues. Most generally, it means any activities used to modify behavior, emotional state, or feelings. Psychological interventions have many different applications and the most common use is for the treatment of mental disorders, most commonly using psychotherapy. The ultimate goal behind these interventions is not only to alleviate symptoms but also to target the root cause of mental disorders.

To treat mental disorders psychological interventions can be coupled with psychoactive medication. Psychiatrists commonly prescribe drugs to manage symptoms of mental disorders. Psychosocial interventions have a greater or more direct focus on a person's social environment in interaction with their psychological functioning.

Psychological interventions can also be used to promote good mental health in order to prevent mental disorders. These interventions are not tailored towards treating a condition but are designed to foster healthy emotions, attitudes and habits. Such interventions can improve quality of life even when mental illness is not present.

Interventions can be diverse and can be tailored specifically to the individual or group receiving treatment depending on their needs. This versatility adds to their effectiveness in addressing any kind of situation.

Psychotherapy, also known as talk therapy, promotes a relationship between a trained psychotherapist and a person suffering from a psychological disorder.

Positive activity interventions (PAIs) are a part of positive psychology. PAIs can be used in psychotherapy as well as outside of it. Examples include helping clients to focus on good things, the future self, gratitude, affirmation of the self and kindness towards others.

See also 
Shakubuku
Wake-up call

References

Psychotherapy